The Communauté de communes du Pays Neslois is a former communauté de communes in the Somme département and in the Picardie région of France. It was created in May 1964. It was merged into the new Communauté de communes de l'Est de la Somme in January 2017.

Composition 
This Communauté de communes comprised 24 communes:

Béthencourt-sur-Somme
Billancourt
Breuil
Buverchy
Cizancourt
Curchy
Épénancourt
Falvy
Grécourt
Hombleux
Languevoisin-Quiquery
Licourt
Mesnil-Saint-Nicaise
Morchain
Moyencourt
Nesle
Pargny
Potte
Rethonvillers
Rouy-le-Grand
Rouy-le-Petit
Saint-Christ-Briost
Villecourt
Voyennes

See also 
Communes of the Somme department

References 

Nesle